Skoulding's Mill is a Grade II listed tower mill at Kelsale, Suffolk, England which has been converted to residential accommodation.

History

Skoulding's Mill was built in 1856 by John Whitmore, the Wickham Market millwright. It was intended to replace a post mill in the same yard. It worked in conjunction with the post mill and a steam mill erected close by. The mill worked by wind until c1905 when it was refitted with roller milling equipment driven by a steam engine. The cap was removed in the early 1950s and the mill stripped of machinery at a later date. The empty mill tower was converted to residential accommodation.

Description

Skoulding's Mill is a tall seven storey tower mill. It is  diameter at the base and  diameter at curb leve. The mill had an ogee cap with a gallery, winded by a fantail. The four double Patent sails drove three pairs of millstones. The lower two storeys of the mill were tarred, with the upper five painted white. The converted mill has a flat roof with a guard rail and a flagpole.

Millers
T & J Skoulding 1865 -
Reference for above:-

References

External links
Windmill World webpage on Skoulding's Mill.

Windmills in Suffolk
Tower mills in the United Kingdom
Windmills completed in 1856
Towers completed in 1856
Grinding mills in the United Kingdom
Grade II listed buildings in Suffolk
Grade II listed windmills
Suffolk Coastal